Be My Wife is a 1921 American silent comedy film written, directed, and starring Max Linder.

Plot
As described in a film magazine, Max (Linder) is seeking the hand of Mary (Allen), but he has a rival and her Aunt Agatha (Rankin) objects to him. He disguises himself as a music teacher, but a dog "Pal" discovers him. Max falls over a fence and becomes unconscious. He dreams that he is married but cannot shake the aunt. There is a wife who suspects her husband of flirting and retaliates by picking a few lovers herself. Just as the marital difficulties are settled, Max wakes up. He then attempts to win over his sweetheart by impersonating a burglar in a terrific struggle with himself in an adjoining room while Mary, his rival, and Aunt Agatha listen to the fight. He steps forth "victorious and wins her hand, and the crabby aunt accepts him as her nephew-in-law.

Cast
 Max Linder as Max, the Fiancé
 Alta Allen as Mary, the Girl
 Caroline Rankin as Aunt Agatha
 Lincoln Stedman as Archie
 Rose Dione as Madame Coralie
 Charles McHugh as Mr. Madame Coralie
 Viora Daniel as Mrs. Du Pont
 Arthur Clayton as Mr. Du Pont

References

External links

Progressive Silent Film List: Be My Wife at silentera.com

1921 films
American black-and-white films
1921 comedy films
American silent feature films
Films directed by Max Linder
Silent American comedy films
1920s American films